Claremont Stars is an American women's soccer team, founded in 2006. The team is a member of the Women's Premier Soccer League, the third tier of women's soccer in the United States and Canada. The team plays in the South Division of the Pacific Conference.

The team plays its home games in the stadium on the campus of Claremont High School in the city of Claremont, California, 35 miles east of downtown Los Angeles. The club's colors are black, yellow and red.

Players

Current roster

Year-by-year

Honors

Competition History

Coaches
 Carlos Juarez 2007–present

Stadia
 Stadium at Claremont High School; Claremont, California 2007–present

Average Attendance

External links
 Official Site
 WPSL Claremont Stars page

Soccer clubs in Greater Los Angeles
Women's soccer clubs in California
Association football clubs established in 2006
2006 establishments in California